The 1977 Humboldt State Lumberjacks football team represented Humboldt State University during the 1977 NCAA Division II football season. Humboldt State competed in the Far Western Conference (FWC).

The 1977 Lumberjacks were led by head coach Bud Van Deren in his 12th season. They played home games at the Redwood Bowl in Arcata, California. Humboldt State finished with a record of five wins, four losses and one tie (5–4–1, 1–3–1 FWC). The Lumberjacks outscored their opponents 200–185 for the season.

Schedule

Notes

References

Humboldt State
Humboldt State Lumberjacks football seasons
Humboldt State Lumberjacks football